Haploporus cylindrosporus is a species of poroid crust fungus in the family Polyporaceae. Found in China, it causes a white rot in decomposing angiosperm wood.

Taxonomy
The fungus was collected from Ailaoshan Nature Reserve  in Jingdong County (Yunnan Province) in August 2015, and described as a new species the following year. The specific epithet cylindrosporus refers to the cylindrical spores.

Description
The hymenophore, or pore surface, is white to cream coloured. The pores number around four to five per millimetre. There is a distinct margin that surrounds the  fruit body, which is up to 2.5 mm wide.

The hyphal structure is dimitic, meaning that there are both generative and skeletal hyphae. The generative hyphae have clamp connections. The thick-walled, cylindrical spores typically measure 10–11.5 by 4.5–5 μm.

References

Fungi described in 2016
Fungi of China
Polyporaceae
Taxa named by Yu-Cheng Dai
Taxa named by Bao-Kai Cui